Origin of religion may refer to:
 Evolutionary origins of religion for information on the evolutionary evidence for the when, where and how the first religions may have arisen.
 Evolutionary psychology of religion for the psychological factors that could have led to religion during evolution.
 History of religion for the portions of religions' origins that have been recorded.